Melany Hernández Torres (born 26 July 1998) is a Mexican diver. She competed at the 2015 World Aquatics Championships  in the women's synchronized 3 metre springboard,
and at the 2016 Summer Olympics.

See also
 Mexico at the 2015 World Aquatics Championships

References

External links

https://secure.meetcontrol.com/divemeets/system/profile.php?number=40298
http://www.gob.mx/presidencia/articulos/mexican-diving-team-invited-to-los-pinos
http://latabernaonline.com/la-clavadista-melany-hernandez-gana-plata-mundial-juvenil-fina/

Mexican female divers
Living people
Place of birth missing (living people)
1998 births
Divers at the 2016 Summer Olympics
Olympic divers of Mexico
Universiade medalists in diving
Universiade gold medalists for Mexico
World Aquatics Championships medalists in diving
Medalists at the 2017 Summer Universiade